Prince Roman Petrovich of Russia (17 October [O.S. 5 October] 1896 – 23 October 1978) was a member of the House of Romanov.

Early life 
Prince Roman Petrovich was born in the Peterhof Palace in St. Petersburg the only son of Grand Duke Peter Nikolaevich of Russia and his wife Princess Milica of Montenegro. Prince Roman belonged to the Nikolaevichi branch of the Russian Imperial Family which was founded by his grandfather Grand Duke Nicholas Nikolaevich.

Biography
In 1916 having graduated from the Nicholas Engineering Academy of Kiev, Prince Roman was posted to serve in a Caucasian Sappers Regiment on the Turkish front. Following the abdication of Emperor Nicholas II, Prince Roman resided at his father's Dulber estate in the Crimea and in April 1919 he left Russia on the British battleship HMS Marlborough.

In 1941 he was offered and refused the crown of the newly established Italian puppet state, the Kingdom of Montenegro.

Marriage and issue 
Prince Roman was married on 16 November 1921 at Cap d'Antibes, France to Countess Praskovia Sheremeteva (18 October 1901–
21 December 1980) and they had two sons:
Nicholas Romanovich, Prince of Russia (1922–2014)
Prince Dimitri Romanovich of Russia (1926–2016)

Ancestry

References

1896 births
1978 deaths
Princes of royal blood (Russia)
White Russian emigrants to France
White Russian emigrants to Italy
Emigrants from the Russian Empire to Italy
Emigrants from the Russian Empire to France